Sandra Jane Haynie (born June 4, 1943) is an American former professional golfer on the LPGA Tour starting in 1961. She won four major championships, 42 LPGA Tour career events, and is a member of the World Golf Hall of Fame.

Amateur career
Haynie was born in Fort Worth, Texas. She won the 1957-58 Texas State Publinx and the 1958-59 Texas Amateur. She also captured the 1960 Trans-Mississippi title.

Professional career
Haynie joined the LPGA Tour in 1961 at the age of 18 and she achieved her first professional title championship in 1962 at age 19 at the Austin Civitan Open.  She would continue to win a total of 42 events on the LPGA Tour, including four major championships. She finished in the top ten on the money list every year from 1963 and 1975. The last time for this distinction was her 14th and final time in 1982 when she placed second in earnings that year as well as four other years. She was awarded LPGA Player of the Year honors in 1970. She was inducted into the World Golf Hall of Fame in 1977. Her last full season on the tour was 1989.

Professional wins

LPGA Tour wins (42)

LPGA Tour playoff record (9–7)

LPGA of Japan Tour wins (1)
1975 Sun Star Ladies

Other wins (1)
1982 Portland Ping Team Championship (with Kathy McMullen)

Major championships

Wins (4)

Team appearances
Professional
Handa Cup (representing the United States): 2006 (winners), 2007 (winners), 2008 (winners), 2009 (winners)

See also
List of golfers with most LPGA Tour wins
List of golfers with most LPGA major championship wins

External links

American female golfers
LPGA Tour golfers
Winners of LPGA major golf championships
World Golf Hall of Fame inductees
Golfers from Texas
Sportspeople from Fort Worth, Texas
1943 births
Living people
21st-century American women